The 1968 Harelbeke–Antwerp–Harelbeke was the 11th edition of the E3 Harelbeke cycle race and was held on 23 March 1968. The race started and finished in Harelbeke. The race was won by Jaak De Boever.

General classification

Notes

References

1968 in Belgian sport
1968